Pines (Pinus species) are used as food plants by the caterpillars of a number of Lepidoptera species, including:

Monophagous
Species which feed exclusively on Pinus

 Batrachedridae
 Batrachedra silvatica – only on chir pine (P. roxburghii)
 Gelechiidae
 Chionodes retiniella – only on ponderosa pine (P. ponderosa)
 Chionodes sabinianus – only on gray pine (P. sabineana)
 Saturniidae
 Coloradia doris (Doris' pinemoth)
 Coloradia luski (Lusk's pinemoth) – only on eastern white pine (P. strobus)
 Coloradia velda (Velda pinemoth)

Polyphagous
Species which feed on Pinus and other plants

 Batrachedridae
 Batrachedra pinicolella – recorded on Scots pine (P. sylvestris)
 Bucculatricidae
 Bucculatrix ulmella – recorded on Scots pine (P. sylvestris)
 Gelechiidae
 Chionodes electella
 Chionodes periculella – recorded on ponderosa pine (P. ponderosa)
 Geometridae
 Bupalus piniaria (bordered white, pine looper)
 Ectropis crepuscularia (engrailed)
 Epirrita autumnata (autumnal moth)
 Odontopera bidentata (scalloped hazel) – recorded on Scots pine (P. sylvestris)
 Lymantriidae
 Lymantria dispar (gypsy moth) – older larvae only
 Noctuidae
 Panolis flammea (pine beauty)
 Saturniidae
 Coloradia pandora (Pandora pinemoth)
 Thaumetopoeidae
 Thaumetopoea pityocampa (pine processionary)
 Tortricidae
 Cydia duplicana – recorded on injured bark of pines
 Epiphyas postvittana (light brown apple moth)

External links

Pines
Lepidoptera